Bradley Wilson (born June 5, 1992) is an American  freestyle skier. He is the younger brother of Olympic bronze medalist Bryon Wilson. They would build and then ski on their own moguls courses in their hometown of Butte, Montana.

Wilson competed at the 2014 Winter Olympics in Sochi, Russia.

He competed at the 2018 Winter Olympics and the 2022 Winter Olympics.

References

External links
 
 
 
 
 

1992 births
Living people
American male freestyle skiers
Olympic freestyle skiers of the United States
Freestyle skiers at the 2014 Winter Olympics
Freestyle skiers at the 2018 Winter Olympics
Freestyle skiers at the 2022 Winter Olympics
Sportspeople from Butte, Montana